The 1995–96 Slovak First Football League was the third season of first-tier football league in Slovakia, since its establishment in 1993. This season started on 29 July 1995 and ended on 12 June 1996. Slovan Bratislava are the defending champions.

Teams
A total of 12 teams was contested in the league, including 11 sides from the 1994–95 season and one promoted from the 2. Liga.

MŠK Žilina was relegated to the 1995–96 2. Liga. The one relegated team was replaced by FC Nitra.

Stadiums and locations

Regular season

League table

Results

Championship group

League table

Results

Relegation group

League table

Results

Relegation play-offs

|}

Season statistics

Top scorers

See also
1995–96 Slovak Cup
1995–96 2. Liga (Slovakia)

References

Slovakia - List of final tables (RSSSF)

Slovak Super Liga seasons
Slovak
1